Hindustani Lal Sena ('Indian Red Army') was an anticolonial guerrilla group in India. It was formed on 13 April 1939 (on the anniversary day of the Jallianwala Bagh massacre). It was founded by Maganlal Bagdi and Pandit Shyam Narain Kashmiri along with their associates.

See also
 Lal Sena

References

Military units and formations established in 1939
Revolutionary movement for Indian independence